Laverne Bryan (born 17 May 1965) is an athlete from Antigua and Barbuda. She competed in both the 800 metres and the 1500 metres at the 1984 Summer Olympics and the 1988 Summer Olympics. She was the first woman to represent Antigua and Barbuda at the Olympics.

References

External links
 

1965 births
Living people
Athletes (track and field) at the 1983 Pan American Games
Athletes (track and field) at the 1984 Summer Olympics
Athletes (track and field) at the 1988 Summer Olympics
Antigua and Barbuda female sprinters
Antigua and Barbuda female middle-distance runners
Olympic athletes of Antigua and Barbuda
Pan American Games competitors for Antigua and Barbuda
Place of birth missing (living people)
Olympic female sprinters